Epicopeia philenora is a moth in the family Epicopeiidae. It was described by John O. Westwood in 1841. It is found in India.

References

Moths described in 1841
Epicopeiidae